Iain James Williamson (born 12 January 1988 in Edinburgh) is a Scottish former professional footballer who last played for Icelandic club ÍA.

Career
Williamson started his senior career with Dunfermline Athletic. He came on as a substitute for Mark Burchill in the closing stages of the 2007 Scottish Cup Final, which Dunfermline lost 1–0 to Celtic. Williamson scored his first goal for the club on 26 April 2008 against Queen of the South in the final game of the 2007–08 season in the Scottish First Division.

In February 2009, Iain signed a loan deal with Dunfermline's local rivals Raith Rovers, lasting until the end of the 2008–09 season. He scored his first goal for Raith Rovers against Stranraer in the Kirkcaldy side's 3–0 away win on 4 April 2009. This win subsequently relegated Stranraer to the Scottish Third Division. Williamson aided Raith in their successful quest to claim the Scottish Second Division Title for the 2008–09 Season, making 11 appearances and scoring one goal with three assists.

Despite being injured for four months in season 2009/10, Williamson still managed to score seven goals, this made him Raith's second top goalscorer that season.

On 23 July 2012, he joined Icelandic Úrvalsdeild side Grindavík. After the 2012 season he joined another Icelandic club, Valur, before the Icelandic 2013 season.

In December 2015, it was announced that he had signed a year-long deal with Úrvalsdeild side Víkingur He then moved on loan to ÍA. On 28 November 2016 Iain made a permanent move to ÍA. However, he announced his retirement on 10 March 2017 due to a chronic hip injury.

See also
Dunfermline Athletic F.C. season 2007-08
Dunfermline Athletic F.C. season 2008-09

References

External links
 
 

Living people
1988 births
Scottish footballers
Dunfermline Athletic F.C. players
Raith Rovers F.C. players
Scottish Football League players
Association football midfielders
Footballers from Edinburgh
Scottish Premier League players
Grindavík men's football players
Úrvalsdeild karla (football) players
Valur (men's football) players
Knattspyrnufélagið Víkingur players
Íþróttabandalag Akraness players
Scottish expatriate sportspeople in Iceland
Scottish expatriate footballers
Expatriate footballers in Iceland